Haisthorpe is a village in the East Riding of Yorkshire, England. It lies on the A614. The village forms part of the civil parish of Carnaby. 

In the village, to the north of the A614, is Grade II listed late 18th-century Haisthorpe Hall.

In 1823 Haisthorpe (then Haysthorp), was in the civil parish of Burton Agnes and the Wapentake of Dickering. Population at the time was 109, with occupations that included four farmers, a shoemaker, and a butcher.

References

External links

Villages in the East Riding of Yorkshire